The following is a partial list of Israeli association football (soccer) stadiums, ranked in descending order of capacity.

Current stadiums

See also
List of association football stadiums by capacity
List of association football stadiums by country
List of Asian stadiums by capacity
List of European stadiums by capacity

References

Israel
stadiums by capacity
 
Football stadiums